Tytuvėnai is a city in the Kelmė district municipality, Lithuania. It is known for its Bernardine monastery.

History
The first church in the town was built in 1555. The construction of the monastery was initiated by Andrius Valavičius and his family, who returned to the Catholic faith after a wave of Counter-Reformation. The construction plans were prepared in 1614, but the construction started only after the death of Andrius Valavičius in 1618. Works were sponsored by Jeronimas Valavičius, the treasurer of the Grand Duchy of Lithuania. In 1633 the main part of monastery and church was completed. In 1772–1780 a courtyard was built, in which Stations of the Cross were placed.

Before World War II, Tytuvėnai was popular as a resort town due to its location among lakes and forests. In 1923, the town had 1164 inhabitants; 221 of them were Jews who made their living in agriculture and small trades. There was a synagogue and a Beth-Midrash in the town. Rabbi Yaakov Kamenetsky was the rabbi of the Tytuvėnai Jewish community from 1926 until 1937, when he emigrated to America.

Two mass executions in Tytuvėnai forest took place in August 1941, but before that, according to witnesses, about 30-40 Jews were taken by carts to Raseiniai and never came back. 15 Jewish men were shot during the first execution in Tytuvėnai forest. The second one took place about a week later, when women, children and the elderly were assembled in the synagogue, then brought to the forest in several trips and shot. Victims had to undress before the execution, while local villagers who were requisitioned to dig waited nearby to cover the bodies. About 160 Jewish women, children and the elderly were shot that day.

References

Cities in Lithuania
Cities in Šiauliai County
Rossiyensky Uyezd
Holocaust locations in Lithuania
Kelmė District Municipality